Sunny Wing Chun Liu (April 6, 1924 – May 20, 1987) was a Seventh-Day Adventist minister and singing evangelist, who was best known in the denomination through his recordings for Chapel Records.

Biography

Early life and career
Sunny Liu was born to Violet Liu in Kealia, Hawaii and raised in Honolulu, Hawaii.  His primary and secondary education took place in Hawaii.  He left Hawaii in 1943 to study voice on the mainland of the United States, largely in the Hollywood area.  He earned a college degree from Walla Walla College in 1948 and became a credentialed Seventh-Day Adventist minister.  From 1949 until 1957 he held a position in musical evangelism for the North Pacific Union Conference of Seventh-Day Adventists.  1951 saw him married to Bernice Lee, with whom he had two sons.  His touring prior to 1952 included concerts in Hawaii, Oregon, Washington, the Hollywood Bowl (1950) and San Francisco in California, and appearances in Canada.  He was ordained as a minister in 1954.

Pastoral period
By mid-1958 he had moved to Jamaica, Queens for denominational work in New York City.  He would later hold pastoral positions in Albany, Elmira, and Troy in New York State.  He was back in the Pacific Northwest in 1965, serving as a pastor in the Portland, Oregon area for twenty-two years, but also involved in Voice of Prophecy evangelism and the 1966 General Conference Session.

Death
Liu died on May 20, 1987, having suffered from cancer for an extended period.

Style
Liu was a dramatic tenor.  His early concerts concentrated on Irish romantic ballads.  As a pastor, his sermons typically included at least one segment of singing.  He recorded several albums for Chapel Records in the sacred style, and by that label's criteria became one of their best-selling artists.  Through these recordings and his appearances in Adventist media he became widely known throughout Adventism.

Discography
"Prayer Perfect" (10-inch LP) - Chapel 1205 (pre-June 1955)
 Prayer Perfect
 Follow, I Will Follow Thee
 Deep Down In My Heart
 Holy, Holy Is What The Angels Sing
 My Testament
 Saved By Grace
 The Lord's Prayer
 An Evening Prayer

"The Holy City" (10-inch LP) - Chapel 1243 (pre-June 1955)
 The Holy City
 Now I Belong to Jesus
 It's In My Heart
 Are You Ready For Jesus to Come
 (four unknown tracks)

"The Beautiful Land" (12-inch LP) - Chapel 5029 (February 1960)
 There's a Beautiful Land on High (Taylor)
 He's Coming to Take Me Up There (Rees)
 I Want to See Heaven (Rees)
 O The Way Is Long and Weary (Root)
 If I Gained the World (Swedish)
 Beautiful Valley of Eden (Sherwin)
 I'd Rather Have Jesus (Shea - Soderstrom)
 My Prayer (Rees)
 The Love of My Lord (Rees)
 Like Jesus (Miller)
 Never Forgotten (Ackley)
 He Is Calling

"Sunny Liu Sings" (12-inch LP) - Chapel 5071
 There'll Be a Day (Mel Rees)
 He May Never Call Again (Mel Rees)
 I'll Never Be Alone (Mel Rees)
 How Great Thou Art (S. Hine)
 Just a Closer Walk
 The Holy City (S. Adams)
 The Hiding Place (M. Rose)
 God Whispered to Me (Mel Rees)
 We'll Talk It Over (I. Stamphill)

"How Big Is God" (12-inch LP) -  Chapel 5094 (monophonic), ST-094 (stereophonic) (1966)

 How Big Is God (Hamblen)
 At The End of The Road (Ackley)
 Follow Me (Tavey)
 Surely Goodness and Mercy (Peterson / Smith)
 For All My Sins (Clayton)
 Ten Thousand Angels (Overholt)
 An Evening Prayer (Gabriel)
 The Great Judgement Morning (Pickett)
 I Need Thee Every Hour (Lowry / Hawks)
 Until Then (Hamblen)

"Songs By Mel Rees" (12-inch LP) -  Chapel 5131

 My Troubled Heart
 When You Look Upon A Lovely Flower
 When He Comes
 Little Lamb
 Oh What A Price He Paid For Me
 As Long As He Loves Me
 My Jesus
 Oh, Wonder Of Wonders
 I Don't Know Why

"The Lord Is My Shepherd" (12-inch LP) -  Chapel 5182
 The Lord Is My Shepherd
 The Living God
 Forward To Christ
 I'll Be A Friend Of His
 Without Him
 He Touched Me
 Where Will You Be
 He Washed My Eyes With Tears
 A Heart Like Thine

"The Best of Sunny Liu" (12-inch LP, Cassette) -  Chapel 5468 (1984)
 How Great Thou Art	
 Just A Closer Walk	
 How Big Is God	
 Until Then	
 Ten Thousand Angels	
 As Long As He Loves Me	
 When He Comes	
 He Touched Me	
 He Washed My Eyes With Tears	
 Without Him

References

1924 births
1987 deaths
American gospel singers
American Protestants
American Seventh-day Adventist ministers
Chapel Records artists
Deaths from cancer in the United States
20th-century American clergy